Catherine Troendle (born 20 February 1961 in Mulhouse) is a member of the Senate of France, representing the Haut-Rhin department.  She is a member of the Union for a Popular Movement. From 2001 until 2017, she was mayor of Ranspach-le-Bas, in Haut-Rhin. Alongside Minister-President Hannelore Kraft, she serves as co-chairwoman of the German-French Friendship Group set up by the German Bundesrat and the French Senate.

References
Page on the Senate website

1961 births
Living people
Politicians from Mulhouse
Union for a Popular Movement politicians
Gaullism, a way forward for France
French Senators of the Fifth Republic
Mayors of places in Grand Est
Women mayors of places in France
Women members of the Senate (France)
21st-century French women politicians
Senators of Haut-Rhin